A Moment of Forever is an album by Kris Kristofferson, released on Justice Records, an independent record label, in 1995 (see 1995 in music). His first studio album of original material since the relatively unsuccessful political record Third World Warrior (1990), it features several well-known studio musicians, including Jim Keltner and Benmont Tench. The album retained the recurring theme of freedom from oppression, but to a lesser extent than his previous two politically charged records - the aforementioned Third World Warrior and Repossessed (1986). The song "Johnny Lobo" is about the Indian activist John Trudell.

Track listing
All songs written by Kris Kristofferson except where noted.

 "A Moment of Forever" (Kristofferson, Daniel Timms) – 4:07
 "Worth Fighting For" (Kristofferson, Timms) – 5:27
 "Johnny Lobo" – 5:09
 "The Promise" – 4:42
 "Shipwrecked in the Eighties" – 4:04
 "Slouching Toward the Millennium" – 3:42
 "Between Heaven and Here" – 3:46
 "Casey's Last Ride" – 4:09
 "Good Love (Shouldn't Feel So Bad)" – 3:37
 "New Game Now" – 4:24
 "New Mister Me" – 3:11
 "Under the Gun" (Kristofferson, Guy Clark) – 4:40
 "Road Warrior's Lament" – 5:46
 "Sam's Song (Ask Any Working Girl)" – 1:51

Personnel
Kris Kristofferson – vocals, acoustic guitar, harmonica
Billy Swan – backing vocals
Sweet Pea Atkinson – backing vocals
Jim Keltner – drums, percussion
Benmont Tench – organ
Sir Harry Bowens – backing vocals
Turner Stephen Bruton – electric guitar, backing vocals
David Campbell – strings, arranger
Jonell Mosser – backing vocals
Dean Parks – mandolin, electric guitar
Jimmy Powers – electric guitar
Daniel Timms – acoustic guitar, piano, backing vocals
Don Was – bass
Reggie Young – electric guitar
Waddy Wachtel – acoustic, electric, steel and slide guitar
Suzie Katayama – accordion, cello

References

Kris Kristofferson albums
1995 albums
albums arranged by David Campbell (composer)
Albums produced by Don Was